ESPN Major League Baseball (ESPN MLB) is a baseball game published by Sega and released in 2004 for the Xbox and PlayStation 2. It is the successor to World Series Baseball 2K3, and the only MLB-licensed Sega game to be released under the ESPN branding. 

The game was given generally positive reviews.

References

2004 video games
ESPN video games
Major League Baseball video games
Xbox games
PlayStation 2 games
Video games developed in the United States
Video games set in 2004
Video games set in the United States
Sega video games